This is a list of scandals in Brazil.

Before 1950

  (1770) An indigenous revolt in Roraima. So many soldiers and native people were killed, their blood tinted the waters of the Branco River.

1960s
Historians believe that construction of the planned capital city of Brasilia was systematically overpriced when built in the early 1960s under Juscelino Kubitscheck presidency.

Military era (1964-1985) 
Little to no evidence of corruption was made public during the military dictatorship era (1964–1985). Recently, however, several cases have become increasingly public knowledge and have been reviewed in books including the journalist Elio Gaspari's series of historical analyses and in the news. Cases ranged from smuggling whiskey and luxury clothes to outright extortion of companies by military-appointed governors (e.g.,  in Paraná), who illegally favored their companies in contractor licensing (e.g. Antonio Carlos Magalhães and Magnesita) and used public money to save their own companies from bankruptcy (e.g., Paulo Maluf and his wife  in the ). British documents pointed out a number of other cases which were suppressed in the 1970s referring to overpriced purchase of UK equipment for construction of ships in Brazil.

1980s

  (1980s) – political and financial scandal that emerged in Brazil in the 1980s and involved allegations of corruption and embezzlement at the National Institute of Social Security for Civil Servants (INAMPS).
 El Maracanazo (1989) – a faked injury at a football match between Brazil and Chile which resulted in Chile being banned from the 1994 World Cup

1990s
  (1992) - President Fernando Collor de Mello was first president of Latin America to face an actual impeachment process.
 Carandiru scandal (1992) - 111 prisoners dead at Carandiru prison, when military police invaded the penitentiary following a prison riot.
  (1993) - 100 million reais kickback scheme.
  (1996)  – a foreign exchange scandal involving a bank in New York
  (1998) - forged documents intended to falsely "prove" that PSDB politicians running in the 1998 election were evading taxes.
  (late 1990s) –  illegal wire tapping and corruption at the Brazilian National Development Bank, leading to arrests and criminal charges against several high-profile political figures and government officials
  (late 1990s) – large bribes to politicians and government officials in exchange for favorable treatment and contracts in multiple countries
  (1999) – an insider-information bankruptcy scandal related to the devaluation of Brazilian currency announced by the government 
 Illegal diamond mining (1999-2004) – armed miners trespassing on the territory of the Cinta Larga indigenous group and conducting illegal mining operations

2000s
  (2000–2002) – a corruption and money laundering scheme during the 2000s that involved the director of the state-owned electric utility in Rio de Janeiro giving illegal campaign funds to politicians, magistrates and businessmen in the 2002 election.
 Odebrecht Case (2001– ) international bribery case by a Brazilian construction company which was also embroiled in the Car Wash scandal. Forced the president of Peru to resign
  (2002) – murder of PT member Celso Daniel and coverup involving buying the silence of witnesses
  (2002) – a political corruption scandal in the 1990s in RJ state government of Anthony Garotinho, involving allegations of widespread bribery and corruption in the Brazilian government and public sector
 BANCOOP case (2002, 2004) - Allegations of money-laundering, invoice padding, Workers'Party slush fund.
  (2003) - Also known as "scandal of locusts" and "grasshopper scandal"; embezzlement that caused the resignation of former governor Neudo Ribeiro Campos from the federal Chamber of Deputies. 
  (2004)
  (2005) - bid-rigging at Correios.
 Mensalão scandal (2005) – parliamentary vote-buying scandal by Luiz Inácio Lula da Silva's administration
  (2005)  –  illegal monthly payments by the Brazilian Insurance and Reinsurance Institute (IRB) to Brazilian federal deputy in exchange for political favors
 Whistle scandal (2005) - Betting on rigged football matches.  
  (2005) - Mayor of Rio Largo José Rafael Torres Barros and employees of nine other Alagoas municipalities skimmed 150 million reis from school lunch funds
  (2006) – financial scandal involving a gang embezzling public money intended for the purchase of ambulances.
 Vampires scandal (2006) –  overcharging for blood supplies 
   (2006) – corruption in the Ministry of Health during the Fernando Henrique Cardoso government, involving the PT electoral campaign arranging to buy a dossier that would implicate the PSDB candidate for governor of São Paulo, José Serra
  (2007) -Alagoas senator Renan Calheiros (PMDB-AL) implicated in taking money from lobbyists.
 Paulo Maluf (March 9, 2007) -  Manhattan's District Attorney office issued an  indictment against Maluf for money laundering in a kickback and inflated invoice scheme that allegedly stole $11.6m from a Brazilian road contract project totaling $140 million. From November 1997 to May 1999 the money passed through an account at Safra National Bank of New York secretly controlled by Maluf. A New York judge on April 25, 2012, dismissed a petition to toss the indictment. The same judge also refused to lift their March 2010 Red notice at Interpol.
 (2009) – Every parliamentarian in the National Congress has an air travel budget to return to their constituencies. Some of them used the benefit to trips abroad or trips of friends and relatives.

2010s
 BTG Pactual (2012) - penalties for André Esteves' insider trading "force[d] the bank to amend its prospectus, give investors the option to reconsidering bids for BTG shares, and put a cloud over one of this year's highest-profile bank deals." 
  (2012) - Joint parliamentary inquiry into politicians and organized crime involved in illegal gambling. Allegedly shut down when Workers' Party money-laundering scheme was uncovered.
  Petrobras refinery purchase in Pasadena (2014) - $1.2 purchase of an oil refinery in Pasadena, Texas resulting in $580 million loss for  Petrobras. Judge Vital do Rego  found indications of "intentional mismanagement to cover up irregularities." and Odebrecht took over work on the Pasadena refinery, which cost between US$ 1 and 2 billion.
 Sabesp (2014) - allegations of failures in the São Paulo's water supply irregularities in the contract between Sabesp and the City of São Paulo.
 Mariana dam disaster (2015) – catastrophic failure of a dam at an iron ore mine on the Doce River in Minas Gerais that released 43.7 million cubic metres of mine tailings into the River, flooding two villages, killing 19 people, and causing a toxic mudflow which created a humanitarian crisis in cities along the river, and reached the Atlantic.
  (2016) - Marcela Temer, First Lady of Brazil, blackmailed after her phone was cloned.
  (2016) - bid fraud involving contracts for vehicle leasing in several Paraiba municipalities 
  (2016) - Embezzlement, bid fraud and corruption in Minas Gerais, including 1 billion reais from emergency relief funds intended for Governador Valadares.
 Port Inquiry (2018) - bribery scandal involving Michel Temer and contracts at the Port of Santos.
 Operation Car Wash (2014 – 2022) a criminal investigation originally involving  money-laundering at the state-owned oil company Petrobras and bribery of government officials, including politicians, senators, governors, and businessmen, which expanded to numerous other companies (notably Odebrecht) and a dozen foreign countries. Considered the largest corruption investigation in the country's history.
 Phases of Operation Car Wash – (2014–2021) eighty individual operations which are part of the Car Wash investigation
 Offshoots of Operation Car Wash (2015–2020) sixty additional operations spawned by the original investigation
 Vaza Jato (2019) – private conversations relating to actions of officials investigating Operation Car Wash
 Operation Patmos - bribery scandal involving Brazilian president Michel Temer, Eduardo Cunha, Joesley Batista of JBS, and federal Senator Aécio Neves 
  offshore drilling tenders from Petrobras.
 2016 Summer Olympics ticket scandal (2016) – attempted illegal resale of hundreds of tickets for the 2016 Summer Olympics
 Rio Olympics (2017) - Sergio Cabral and others in a bribery scandal centered on choosing Rio de Janeiro as an Olympic venue.
 Lochtegate (2016) – scandal involving U.S. Olympic swim team members who falsely reported a crime while at the Rio Olympics in 2016
 Panama Papers (2016)  – published leaked documents that revealed corruption in many countries
 Paradise Papers (2017) – leaked documents relating to offshore investments implicating people in dozens of countries
Fernando Collor de Mello (August 2017) Collor was accused by Brazil's Supreme Federal Court of receiving around US$9 million in bribes between 2010 and 2014 from Petrobras subsidiary BR Distributor.
 JBS S.A. (2017) – "...during its rapid rise to become the world’s biggest meatpacker, JBS and its network of subsidiaries have been linked to allegations of high-level corruption, modern-day “slave labour” practices, illegal deforestation, animal welfare violations and major hygiene breaches."
 Operation Weak Meat - US FDA uncovers bribery of Brazilian meat inspectors 
 Moro x Bolsonaro Case (2019) – statements made by former minister Sérgio Moro about President Jair Bolsonaro's alleged attempt to interfere in investigations related to his family members and the Federal Police
 Brumadinho dam disaster (2019) - 270 people died after a catastrophic failure. Public Prosecutor's Office complaint pointed to a collusion between owner Vale and certification company Tüv Süd led to the issuance of false declarations of dam stability. Sixteen employees and the two companies were formally charged by 270 homicides and environmental crimes.
 Amazon clandestine aerodromes (2019) - to provide transport to far communities, pilots prepare false flight plans, as most aerodromes that serve indigenous communities in the Amazon are unregistered because they do not meet safety standards.

2020s 
 Covaxgate (2021) – irregularities in the purchase of 20 million doses of the Indian vaccine Covaxin by the Brazilian Ministry of Health
 Lojas Americanas (2023) – "20 billion reais ($3.9 billion) in accounting “inconsistencies” at Americanas"
 Yanomami humanitarian crisis - the Federal public prosecutor's office denounced the government's failure to act against armed gangs of illegal miners during the presidency of Jair Bolsonaro as having precipitated the Yanomami humanitarian crisis which resulted in mass deaths, famine, and forced displacements.

See also 

 Brazilian Anti-Corruption Act
 Corruption in Brazil
 Crime in Brazil
 Economy of Brazil
 Impeachment of Dilma Rousseff
 Impeachment proposals against Michel Temer
 List of political scandals in Argentina
 List of political scandals in Chile
 List of political scandals in France
 List of political scandals in Germany
 List of political scandals in the United Kingdom
 Mani pulite
 Politics of Brazil

Works cited

References 

Scandals
Brazil history-related lists
Brazil
Political history of Brazil
Political scandals in Brazil
Sports scandals in Brazil